Patricia Black may refer to:
 Patricia Black (Irish republican)
 Patricia Black (actress)